Naanu Mattu Varalakshmi is a 2016 Indian Kannada-language action film written and directed by Preetham Gubbi and produced by Jayanna-Bhogendra. It stars Prithvi, the grandson of musician G. K. Venkatesh in his debut, and Malavika Mohanan in her Kannada debut. Prakash Raj, Madhoo, Charandeep and Rangayana Raghu play supporting roles. The music is composed by V. Harikrishna. The film was released on 16 December 2016.

Cast
 Prithvi as Munna
 Malavika Mohanan as Varalakshmi
 Prakash Raj as Trainer
 Madhoo
 Charandeep as Racer Charan
 Rangayana Raghu
 Achyuth Kumar
 Sadhu Kokila
Aravind KP as Motorcyclist
 Pavitra Lokesh
 Ashok Sharma

Production

Development and casting
After the debacle of Boxer in 2015, director-writer Preetham teamed up yet again with the producers Jayanna-Bhogendra duo and took motocross racing as the theme for his next directorial venture. For this film, he brought in six national champions, including a couple of them with international acclaim. He also hired Vijaykumar, a professional motocross racer of many international awards, as a team coach to help with the proceedings. For the lead roles, he selected the fresh faces Prithvi and Malayalam actress Malavika Mohanan. Prithvi, the grandson of music director G. K. Venkatesh, is an engineering graduate and is trained in acting, stunts and dancing. Charandeep was chosen to play the antagonist as another race who is an opponent to Prithvi.

Shooting
The principal photography of the film officially began from 15 December 2015 in Bangalore behind Manyata Tech Park where a race track was being set up for the shoot. The crew consisted of some technically professional racers whom Preetham wanted the scene to "look authentic, since it is a tough sport and any cover-up by the technical team will show upfront." The first schedule of filming ended at Ooty. For the climax portions, Preetham chose to shoot in Sri Lanka where two tracks are meant for the bike races.

Soundtrack
The soundtrack is composed by V. Harikrishna.

Track listing

References

External links

2016 films
Indian action films
Indian auto racing films
Films scored by V. Harikrishna
Motorcycle racing films
Films shot in Sri Lanka
Films shot in Ooty
Indian road movies
Indian chase films
2010s Kannada-language films
Films directed by Preetham Gubbi
2016 action films
2010s chase films
2010s road movies